The cinnamon-breasted whistler (Pachycephala johni)  is a species of bird in the family Pachycephalidae.  It is endemic to Obira in the Maluku Islands. Formerly, some authorities considered it to be a subspecies of the rufous whistler, while others continue to classify it as a subspecies of the drab whistler.

References

cinnamon-breasted whistler
Birds of the Maluku Islands
cinnamon-breasted whistler

pt:Pachycephala griseonota